Robert Arbuthnot or Arbuthnott may refer to:

 Robert Arbuthnot, 1st Viscount of Arbuthnott (bef. 1625 –1655)
 Robert Arbuthnot, 2nd Viscount of Arbuthnott (died 1682) 
 Robert Arbuthnot, 3rd Viscount of Arbuthnott (1661–1694)
 Robert Arbuthnot (auditor) (1669–1727), Auditor of the Exchequer in Scotland
 Robert Arbuthnot, 4th Viscount of Arbuthnott (1686–1710)
 Keith Arbuthnott, 15th Viscount of Arbuthnott (Robert Keith Arbuthnott, 1897–1966), British Army general
 Robert Arbuthnot of Haddo (1728–1803), trustee of Board of Manufactures
 Robert Arbuthnot (Ceylon) (c. 1761–1809), British soldier and diplomat
 Robert Arbuthnot (British Army officer) (1773–1853), British Army general
 Sir Robert Arbuthnot, 2nd Baronet (1801–1873), Scottish civil servant
 Sir Robert Arbuthnot, 4th Baronet (1864–1916), British Royal Navy admiral
 Sir Robert Dalrymple Arbuthnot, 6th Baronet (1919–1944); see Arbuthnot baronets